The 2002–03 season was the 18th season in the existence of Le Mans UC72 and the club's thirteenth consecutive season in the second division of French football. In addition to the domestic league, Le Mans participated in this season's edition of the Coupe de France and the Coupe de la Ligue.

Players

First-team squad

Transfers

In

Out

Competitions

Overall record

Ligue 2

League table

Results summary

Results by round

Matches

Coupe de France

Coupe de la Ligue

Statistics

Appearances and goals

Goalscorers

References

Le Mans FC seasons
Le Mans